Marie A. Vitulli is an American mathematician and professor emerita at the University of Oregon.

Mathematics

Vitulli's research is in commutative algebra and applications to algebraic geometry. More specific topics in her research include deformations of monomial curves, seminormal rings, the weak normality of commutative rings and algebraic varieties, weak subintegrality, and the theory of valuations for commutative rings. Along with her colleague David K. Harrison, she developed a unified valuation theory for rings with zero divisors that generalized both Krull and Archimedean valuations.

She was an undergraduate at the University of Rochester and
obtained her PhD in 1976 at the University of Pennsylvania under the supervision of Dock-Sang Rim. Her dissertation was Weierstrass Points and Monomial Curves.  The title of her 2014 Falconer lecture was "From Algebraic to Weak Subintegral Extensions in Algebra and Geometry."

Activism

Vitulli and political scientist Gordon Lafer led an effort to unionize faculty at the University of Oregon beginning in the spring of 2007.  This effort eventually led to the formation of the United Academics at the University of Oregon.

Vitulli heads the Women in Math Project at the University of Oregon.
With Mary Flahive, Vitulli has also studied patterns in hiring among women mathematicians. Vitulli has also written about the difficulties involved with documenting the lives of female mathematicians on Wikipedia.

Vitulli participated in the panel discussion held as the first official activity of Spectra at the 2015 Joint Mathematics Meetings. She endowed the MSRI Marie A. Vitulli Graduate Fellowship to "support one advanced graduate student in mathematics, per academic year, to attend an MSRI program with their advisor."

Recognition
Vitulli was recognized as an AWM/MAA Falconer Lecturer in 2014.  Vitulli received a Service Award from the Association for Women in Mathematics in 2017.

She is part of the 2019 class of fellows of the Association for Women in Mathematics.
She was elected as a Fellow of the American Mathematical Society in the 2020 Class, for "contributions to commutative algebra, and for service to the mathematical community particularly in support of women in mathematics".

References

External links
 

American women mathematicians
20th-century American mathematicians
21st-century American mathematicians
Living people
University of Rochester alumni
University of Pennsylvania alumni
University of Oregon faculty
1949 births
Fellows of the American Mathematical Society
Fellows of the Association for Women in Mathematics
20th-century women mathematicians
21st-century women mathematicians
20th-century American women
21st-century American women
LGBT mathematicians